Radio Nueva Vida (New Life) is a Spanish-language Christian radio network based in Camarillo, California, United States. It is owned and operated by The Association for Community Education, Inc., a California non-profit 501(c)(3) organization established in 1987.

History
Radio Nueva Vida began broadcasting on January 18, 1987 after building radio station KMRO (90.3 FM) in Camarillo, California. In 1996, additional full-service stations were added to the network to serve Bakersfield and Kern County (KGZO, 90.9 FM), and Fresno and surrounding counties (KEYQ, 980 AM). It added additional FM repeater stations, which cover the California communities of Salinas, San Bernardino, Santa Ana, Victorville, Indio, Palm Springs, Soledad, Los Banos, the San Fernando Valley, Colton, Coachella, Desert Center, Lancaster, Santa Barbara, King City, and Santa Maria, as well as Redmond, Oregon.

In 2000 and 2001, Nueva Vida underwent a major expansion, broadcasting on three full-power AM stations, all in California, that had been broadcasting in English. They were KLTX (1390 AM) in Long Beach/Los Angeles, KEZY (1240 AM) in Riverside/San Bernardino, and KSDO (1130 AM) in San Diego, all property of Hi-Favor Broadcasting, LLC. All three stations had been owned by major corporations: KLTX and KEZY by Salem Communications and KSDO by Chase Media with a joint sales agreement with Clear Channel Communications. Unlike the majority of Nueva Vida's stations, which are licensed as non-commercial educational, the new stations were commercial licenses, held by a for-profit arm of the organization, which allowed them to accept advertisements in order to help pay the cost of operation.

After Educational Media Foundation (EMF) discontinued its affiliation with God's Country Radio Network in November 2010, EMF switched most of those stations to Radio Nueva Vida.

Programming and publication
Radio Nueva Vida's programming format consists of Christian music and talk in Spanish. Its 'In House' programs target the Hispanic community and its current needs. The Sembrador Informativo is the monthly newsletter mailed to its supporters and listeners.

Means of support
Radio Nueva Vida, a non-profit organization, is listener supported in a manner similar to that of public radio stations. Its listener-supporters are called Sembradores (Seed Sowers). Sembradores are recruited twice a year in pledge drives by the station, though listeners may donate at any time. There is no minimum amount of money required to become a Sembrador; any amount is accepted and all donors are encouraged to contribute whatever they can.

Outreaches
Radio Nueva Vida has produced a number of large gatherings entitled: Encounters with God at The Forum in Los Angeles, El Toreo of Tijuana, and in Bakersfield, Fresno, San Bernardino, and San Diego.

Station list
Below is a complete list of stations as provided by the Radio Nueva Vida website.

Full Power Stations

Notes:

Translators

HD Stations

References

External links

Radio Nueva Vida webcast
Radio Nueva Vida's Newsletter
Radio Locator

Radio stations established in 1987
Christian radio stations in the United States
Spanish-language radio stations in California
Mass media in Ventura County, California